The 2010 Lambertz Open by STAWAG was a professional tennis tournament played on carpet. It was the 20th edition of the tournament which is part of the 2010 ATP Challenger Tour. It took place in Aachen, Germany between 8 and 14 November 2010.

ATP entrants

Seeds

 Rankings are as of November 1, 2010.

Other entrants
The following players received wildcards into the singles main draw:
  Leif Berger
  Marko Djokovic
  Gero Kretschmer
  Willi Peter

The following players received entry from the qualifying draw:
  Maxime Authom
  Adrien Bossel
  Baptiste Dupuy
  Pierre-Hugues Herbert

Champions

Singles

 Dustin Brown def.  Igor Sijsling, 6–3, 7–6(3)

Doubles

 Ruben Bemelmans /  Igor Sijsling def.  Jamie Delgado /  Jonathan Marray, 6–4, 3–6, [11–9]

External links
Official Website
ITF Search 
ATP official site

Lambertz Open by STAWAG
Lambertz Open by STAWAG
2010 in German tennis